Robert Thomas Patton (born October 21, 1954) is a former American football center who played for one season in the National Football League (NFL). He played high school football at West Side Central Catholic High School (later Bishop O'Reilly - now closed) in Kingston, Pennsylvania and college football for the Delaware Fightin' Blue Hens, he was signed by the Buffalo Bills as an undrafted free agent in 1976. He played in 12 games for the Bills in 1976.

College career
Patton played college football for the University of Delaware Fightin' Blue Hens. He earned United Press International All-East honors as an offensive guard in 1975. He also earned the Robert C. Peoples Outstanding Senior Lineman award as a senior.

Professional career
The Buffalo Bills signed Patton as an undrafted free agent on May 20, 1976. He played in 12 games for the Bills in 1976.

References

1954 births
Living people
People from Jacksonville, North Carolina
Players of American football from North Carolina
American football offensive guards
American football centers
Delaware Fightin' Blue Hens football players
Buffalo Bills players